The stick may refer to several separate units, depending on the item being measured.

Length
In English-language papers, it was roughly equal to 2 column inches or 100–150 words. In France, Spain, and Italy, sticks generally contained only between 1 and 4 lines of text each. A column was notionally equal to 10 sticks.

Mass

Volume
In American cooking, a stick of butter may also be understood as ½ cup or 8 tablespoons (about 118 mL).

See also
 English, imperial, and US customary units
 Traditional point-size names

References

Citations

Bibliography
 .
 .
 .
 .
 .
 .
 .

Units of length
Units of mass
Typography
Typesetting